A statesman or stateswoman typically is a politician who has had a long and respected political career at the national or international level.

Statesman or Statesmen may also refer to:

Newspapers

United States
 The Statesman (Denver, Colorado), early name of the Denver Star, a defunct African American weekly newspaper published in Denver, Colorado
 The Statesman (Oregon), a newspaper in Salem, Oregon, merged into the Statesman Journal
 The Statesman (Pittsburgh), a 19th-century newspaper in Pittsburgh, Pennsylvania
 The Statesman (Stony Brook), the student newspaper of Stony Brook University, New York
 The Colorado Statesman, a now defunct weekly newspaper published in Denver, Colorado
 Idaho Statesman, a newspaper in Boise, Idaho
 Michigan Statesman, an early name of the Kalamazoo Gazette, Kalamazoo, Michigan
 Mountain Statesman, Grafton, West Virginia

Elsewhere
 The Canadian Statesman, published in Bowmanville, Ontario, Canada from 1894 to 2008
 The Statesman Newspaper, the oldest mainstream newspaper in Ghana
 The Statesman (India), an Indian English newspaper
 Dainik Statesman, an Indian Bengali newspaper
 The Statesman (Pakistan), a Pakistani newspaper

Arts and entertainment
 Statesman (novel), a 1986 novel by Piers Anthony
 Statesman (Marvel Cinematic Universe), a spaceship in the Marvel Cinematic Universe
 The Statesmen, aka The Statesmen Quartet, a gospel music group
 Statesman, the American counterpart to the Kingsman organization in the film Kingsman: The Golden Circle

Automobiles
 Statesman (automobile), produced by Australian General Motors subsidiary Holden from 1971 to 1985
 Nash Statesman, produced by Nash, Nash-Kelvinator Corporation, and American Motors

Other uses
 , a British Royal Navy submarine
 Statesman (dialogue), a Socratic dialogue written by Plato
 The Statesman, an 1836 essay by Henry Taylor
 Packard Bell Statesman, an economy line of notebook computers introduced in 199
 Statesman, a man who lives on a landed estate, in the dialect of the British Lake District

See also

 Statesman-Examiner, a weekly newspaper in Colville, Washington
 Austin American-Statesman, a newspaper in Austin, Texas
 London Statesman, two merchant ships
 New Statesmen (disambiguation)

Lists of newspapers